Rasno is a village in Bosnia and Herzegovina. According to the 1991 census, the village is located in the municipality of Široki Brijeg.

Demographics 
According to the 2013 census, its population was 621.

Famous people 
Ivan Softa (1906-1945), Croatian writer

References

Populated places in Široki Brijeg